Sotnikov and Sotnikova is a Slavic surname. People with this surname include:

Male
Dmitry Sotnikov (born 1984), Russian rally raid truck driver
Ivan Sotnikov (1913–2004), Soviet canoeist
Viktor Sotnikov (athlete) (born 1974), Russian triple jumper
Vladimir Sotnikov (born 2004), Russian Paralympic swimmer
Yevgen Sotnikov (1980–2021), Ukrainian judoka

Female
Adelina Sotnikova (born 1996), Russian figure skater
Alyona Sotnikova (born 1992), Ukrainian tennis player
Tatiana Sotnikova (born 1981), Russian ice hockey player
Vera Sotnikova (born 1960), Russian actress
Yuliya Sotnikova (born 1970), Russian sprinter

Surnames
Russian-language surnames